Ramjilal Yadava (born 5 May 1922) is an Indian politician and was the member of 6th Lok Sabha. He started his political career in 1952 when he was elected to Rajasthan Legislative Assembly. In 1977 he was elected  to Lok Sabha from Alwar as Janata Party candidate and again in 1989 as Janata Dal candidate.

References

1922 births
Year of death missing
India MPs 1977–1979
Janata Party politicians
Indian National Congress politicians
Janata Dal politicians
Vishal Haryana Party politicians
India MPs 1989–1991
People from Alwar
Lok Sabha members from Rajasthan
Rajasthan MLAs 1952–1957